Pierre Emile Deschamps (25 October 1856 – 12 October 1923) was a French golfer. He competed in the men's individual event at the 1900 Summer Olympics.

References

External links
 

French male golfers
Amateur golfers
Olympic golfers of France
Golfers at the 1900 Summer Olympics
Sportspeople from Neuilly-sur-Seine
1856 births
1923 deaths